Frederika Randall (1948 – 12 May 2020) was an American-Italian translator and journalist. Born in western Pennsylvania, she expatriated to Italy in 1985 at the age of 37. A prolific translator, her works included Confessions of an Italian, considered one of the most important Italian novels of the 19th century.

Early life
Randall was born in 1948, in a town "downstream from Pittsburgh on the Ohio River". She attended Harvard University, where she graduated with a B.A. in English literature in 1970, and the Massachusetts Institute of Technology, where she attained an M.A. in urban planning working towards a Ph.D., which was left at the all but dissertation level. For a short period, she worked as an urban planner.

Journalism
Randall was the Rome correspondent for The Nation, where she was described as "an acute chronicler of the postwar death spiral of Italian democracy". She was an outspoken critic of Silvio Berlusconi and Matteo Salvini. In addition to her work at The Nation, Randall was a freelance writer for the New York Times, the Wall Street Journal, and Internazionale.

Translation
Randall shifted her focus from journalism to translation in 2002, after she was catastrophically injured jumping from a third-story balcony; the disabilities she suffered as a result of the fall impaired her ability to work in the journalistic field. She was "enormously admired" by her peers in Italian-to-English translation, and translated seminal works such as Confessions of an Italian. Randall's translation of Confessions of an Italian, the first unabridged English version, was highly praised. She acquired a reputation for successful translations of works previously labelled "untranslatable", such as  Deliver Us by Luigi Meneghello.

Randall was awarded a PEN/Heim Translation Prize in 2009 and shortlisted for the Italian Prose in Translation Award in 2017. She would later be posthumously awarded the 2020 Italian Prose in Translation Award for I Am God.

Personal life
Randall moved to Rome from the United States in 1985. She identified as a "dispatriate", intentionally distancing herself from her nation of origin. She was married to an Italian national and had one son, the biologist Tommaso Jucker.

Notable translations
Dissipato H.G.: The Vanishing, Guido Morselli, 1977 (English pub. 2020)
I Am God, Giacomo Sartori, 2016 (English pub. 2019)
, Guido Morselli, 1976 (English pub. 2017)
Confessions of an Italian, Ippolito Nievo, 1867 (English pub. 2014)
, Luigi Meneghello, 1963 (English pub. 2012)

References

Italian journalists
Italian translators
American translators
Italian–English translators
1948 births
2020 deaths
Massachusetts Institute of Technology alumni
Harvard College alumni
Italian women journalists
American expatriates in Italy